George William Sharpe (2 September 1912 – 21 January 1984) was an English professional footballer who played as an inside forward or an outside forward in the Football League for York City and in non-League football for Selby Town.

References

1912 births
Footballers from York
1984 deaths
English footballers
Association football forwards
York City F.C. players
Selby Town F.C. players
Midland Football League players
English Football League players